In enzymology, a tRNA (cytosine-5-)-methyltransferase is an enzyme that catalyzes the chemical reaction

S-adenosyl-L-methionine + tRNA  S-adenosyl-L-homocysteine + tRNA containing 5-methylcytosine

Thus, the two substrates of this enzyme are S-adenosyl methionine and tRNA, whereas its two products are S-adenosylhomocysteine and tRNA containing 5-methylcytosine.

This enzyme belongs to the family of transferases, specifically those transferring one-carbon group methyltransferases.  The systematic name of this enzyme class is S-adenosyl-L-methionine:tRNA (cytosine-5-)-methyltransferase. Other names in common use include transfer ribonucleate cytosine 5-methyltransferase, and transfer RNA cytosine 5-methyltransferase.

References

 
 
 

EC 2.1.1
Enzymes of unknown structure